Geoffrey Arthur Holland Pearson,  (December 24, 1927 – March 18, 2008) was a Canadian diplomat and author. He was the son of former Prime Minister of Canada Lester B. Pearson and Maryon Pearson.

Biography 
Born in Toronto, Pearson was educated at Trinity College School in Port Hope, Ontario, the University of Toronto, and the University of Oxford.

Pearson joined the Department of External Affairs (now called Global Affairs Canada) in 1952, being the second of three members of his family to serve in Canada's diplomatic service. His father was Secretary of State for External Affairs and his son, Michael, would be a senior civil servant.

He held diplomatic appointments at the Canadian embassies in Paris and Mexico City, and at the high commission in New Delhi. From 1980 to 1983, he served as Canada's ambassador to the Soviet Union. He was also Ambassador to Mongolia from 1980 to 1981.

In late 1983, Pearson was appointed as a special representative for arms control to then-Prime Minister Pierre Trudeau, and in 1984 he was seconded to the Canadian Institute of International Affairs. In January 1985, he was appointed as the first executive director of the Canadian Institute for International Peace and Security, where he served for six years. In 1996, his book Seize the Day was published, chronicling his father's diplomatic legacy. Pearson was a past president of the United Nations Association in Canada. In 2000, he was made an Officer of the Order of Canada.

Pearson died in Ottawa, Ontario, on March 18, 2008. He is survived by his wife, Senator Landon Pearson (served 1994–2005), and their five children—Patricia, Michael, Hilary, Anne, and Katherine.

Published works

Notes

References

 Obituary: Geoffrey Pearson 1927-2008 Diplomat elevated Canada's UN role, Toronto Star, March 20, 2008 pp A24
 Obituary Geoffrey Pearson, 80.
 GEOFFREY PEARSON TO VISIT EDMONTON For immediate release Saturday, October 20, 2001

1927 births
2008 deaths
Canadian people of Anglo-Irish descent
Children of prime ministers of Canada
Officers of the Order of Canada
Writers from Toronto
University of Toronto alumni
Ambassadors of Canada to the Soviet Union
Ambassadors of Canada to Mongolia
Alumni of New College, Oxford
Geoffrey
Canadian biographers
Canadian male non-fiction writers
Male biographers
20th-century Canadian non-fiction writers
20th-century Canadian male writers
Canadian political writers
20th-century biographers